Charles Brandon may refer to:

Charles Brandon, 1st Duke of Suffolk (1484–1545), close friend and brother-in-law of Henry VIII
Charles Brandon, 3rd Duke of Suffolk (1537–1551), second son of the above and his fourth wife, Catherine Willoughby
Charles Brandon (died 1551), MP, illegitimate son of 1st Duke of Suffolk
Charles Brandon (The Tudors)

See also
Charlie Brandon (born 1945), Canadian football player